Edgaras Jankauskas (born 12 March 1975) is a Lithuanian football manager and former professional player. He is the manager of the Lithuania national team.

A powerful forward during his playing career, Jankauskas excelled in the physical side of the game. Other than in his native Lithuania, he played professionally in nine countries, and represented the Lithuania national team for almost 20 years.

Whilst with Porto, Jankauskas made history as the first Lithuanian footballer to win the Champions League, in 2004. Ten years later, he began working as a full-time manager.

Club career

Early years and Brugge
Born in Vilnius, Lithuanian Soviet Socialist Republic, Soviet Union, Jankauskas moved to local FK Žalgiris' youth ranks at 16, from neighbouring FK Panerys. In 1996 he joined PFC CSKA Moscow, and later spent a further year in the Russian capital with FC Torpedo.

Jankauskas signed with Club Brugge KV in 1997, and helped the club win the Belgian Pro League in his first season. However, in January 2000, he became the most expensive Lithuanian player of all time when Real Sociedad paid €2.4 million for his services.

Portugal
After another year and a half in San Sebastián, Jankauskas was loaned to S.L. Benfica for the 2001–02 season, and the following year was signed by FC Porto, under manager José Mourinho. Although not always a regular starter, he made an important contribution to a side which conquered all in Portugal, winning the Primeira Liga and Taça de Portugal double in 2002–03 and the national championship in the following campaign.

Jankauskas also helped Porto to achieve European success and, while he missed selection for the 2003 UEFA Cup final-winning squad, he was a substitute when the Dragons won the UEFA Champions League against AS Monaco FC in the following year.

Hearts and later career
After the departure of Mourinho, Jankauskas fell out of favor in Porto and joined OGC Nice on loan, but he failed to settle in France and eventually signed for Scottish Premier League club Heart of Midlothian – via FBK Kaunas – in 2005. In a complex deal, he was loaned to Hearts at the behest of Vladimir Romanov, who controlled both clubs, and spent the next two seasons in Edinburgh.

In 2005–06, Jankauskas' experience and goals helped Hearts to win the Scottish Cup and achieve Champions league qualification by finishing second in the league. The following campaign was less successful for him, as injuries and indifferent form limited his appearances; after his Kaunas and Hearts contracts expired in June 2007, he signed with Cyprus's AEK Larnaca FC.

On 30 January 2008, Jankauskas joined Portuguese League team C.F. Os Belenenses. He terminated his contract after only a few months, moving to Latvia's Skonto FC in the summer after claiming he wanted to play closer to his homeland.

At the start of 2009, Jankauskas was working on obtaining his coaching badges, and pondering his retirement. In June, however, it was revealed that he would be heading to the United States for a trial with Major League Soccer club New England Revolution. On 28 June 2009, pending the arrival of his P1 Visa and ITC documents, a deal was arranged for the 34-year-old; his week 26 goal against the Kansas City Wizards was nominated for the MLS Goal of the Year Award.

On 30 September 2010, Jankauskas was released by the Revolution. He moved to FC Fakel Voronezh in the Russian second level shortly after, retiring after only a couple of months.

In July 2012, Jankauskas returned to Hearts as an assistant manager, leaving his post at the end of the season.

International career
Jankauskas was an important part of the Lithuanian national side since 1991 when, at the age of just 16, he helped the country to the 1991 Baltic Cup, playing the last 30 minutes of the 4–1 final win against Estonia. He scored his first international goal on 5 October 1996, in a 1998 FIFA World Cup qualifier against Iceland (2–0), and went on to net a further nine in 56 appearances, in eighteen years of play (he did not appear for the national team, however, from 1992 to 1995).

On 12 January 2016, after a brief spell at club level with FK Trakai, Jankauskas replaced Igoris Pankratjevas at the helm of Lithuania. On 4 December 2018, he was dismissed.

International goals
Scores and results list Lithuania's goal tally first, score column indicates score after each Jankauskas goal.

Managerial statistics

Honours

Žalgiris
A Lyga: 1991, 1992
Lithuanian Football Cup 1991, 1993, 1994

Club Brugge
Belgian Pro League: 1997–98
Belgian Supercup: 1998

Porto
Primeira Liga: 2002–03, 2003–04
Taça de Portugal: 2002–03
Supertaça Cândido de Oliveira: 2003 
UEFA Champions League: 2003–04
UEFA Cup: 2002–03

Hearts
Scottish Cup: 2005–06

Lithuania
Baltic Cup: 1991

Individual
Lithuanian Player of the Year: 1997, 1998, 2000, 2001, 2004

References

External links
Club Brugge archives 

MLS player profile

London Hearts profile
LegionerKulichi profile 

1975 births
Living people
Lithuanian people of Russian descent
Footballers from Vilnius
Lithuanian footballers
Association football forwards
Lithuania international footballers
A Lyga players
FK Žalgiris players
FBK Kaunas footballers
Russian Premier League players
PFC CSKA Moscow players
FC Torpedo Moscow players
FC Fakel Voronezh players
Belgian Pro League players
Club Brugge KV players
La Liga players
Real Sociedad footballers
Primeira Liga players
S.L. Benfica footballers
FC Porto players
C.F. Os Belenenses players
Ligue 1 players
OGC Nice players
Scottish Premier League players
Heart of Midlothian F.C. players
Cypriot First Division players
AEK Larnaca FC players
Skonto FC players
Major League Soccer players
New England Revolution players
Lithuanian football managers
FK Riteriai managers
Lithuania national football team managers
UEFA Champions League winning players
UEFA Cup winning players
Lithuanian expatriate footballers
Lithuanian expatriate sportspeople in Russia
Expatriate footballers in Russia
Lithuanian expatriate sportspeople in Belgium
Expatriate footballers in Belgium
Lithuanian expatriate sportspeople in Spain
Expatriate footballers in Spain
Lithuanian expatriate sportspeople in Portugal
Expatriate footballers in Portugal
Lithuanian expatriate sportspeople in France
Expatriate footballers in France
Lithuanian expatriate sportspeople in Scotland
Expatriate footballers in Scotland
Lithuanian expatriate sportspeople in Cyprus
Expatriate footballers in Cyprus
Lithuanian expatriate sportspeople in Latvia
Expatriate footballers in Latvia
Lithuanian expatriate sportspeople in the United States
Expatriate soccer players in the United States